Tugali is a genus of small sea snails or limpets, a marine gastropod mollusc in the subfamily Emarginulinae of the family Fissurellidae, the keyhole limpets and slit limpets.

Species and subspecies
Species and subspecies within the genus Tugali include:
 † Tugali aranea Marwick, 1928 
Tugali barnardi (Tomlin, 1932)
 Tugali carinata (A. Adams, 1852)
Tugali chilensis McLean, 1970
Tugali cicatricosa Adams, 1852 
Tugali colvillensis Finlay, 1927
Tugali decussata Adams, 1852
 † Tugali elata (Suter, 1917) 
Tugali elegans Gray, 1843
Tugali oblonga (Pease, 1860) 
 † Tugali opuraensis Bartrum & Powell, 1928 
 Tugali parmophoidea (Quoy & Gaimard, 1834)
 † Tugali pliocenica Finlay, 1926 
Tugali scutellaris Adams, 1852
Tugali stewartiana Powell, 1939
 † Tugali superba Powell, 1934 
Tugali suteri (Thiele, 1916)
Tugali suteri sutherlandi Fleming, 1948

Species brought into synonymy
 Tugali chilensis Sowerby, 1834: synonym of Fissurella costata (Lesson, 1830)
Tugali gigas (Martens, 1881): synonym of Tugalina gigas (Martens, 1881)
 Tugali parmophoidea Quoy & Gaimard, 1834: synonym of Tugali elegans Gray, 1843
 Tugali plana (Schepman, 1908): synonym of Tugalina plana (Schepman)
 Tugali radiata (Habe, T., 1953): synonym of Tugalina radiata Habe, 1953
 Tugali tasmanica Tenison-Woods, J.E., 1877: synonym of  Tugali parmophoidea Quoy & Gaimard, 1834
 Tugali vadososinuata (Yokoyama, M., 1922): synonym of Tugalina vadososinuata (Yokoyama, 1922)

References

 Powell A W B, William Collins Publishers Ltd, Auckland 1979 
 Molluscs of Tasmania info
 Higo, S., Callomon, P. & Goto, Y. (1999) Catalogue and Bibliography of the Marine Shell-Bearing Mollusca of Japan. Elle Scientific Publications, Yao, Japan, 749 pp.

Fissurellidae
Gastropods of New Zealand
Taxa named by John Edward Gray